J. M. Lobo Prabhu was an Indian politician of Swatantra Party.He represented the
Udupi (Lok Sabha constituency) in the fourth Lok Sabha.

References

People from Udupi district
India MPs 1967–1970
Swatantra Party politicians
Lok Sabha members from Karnataka